Kalinga is a dialect continuum of Kalinga Province in the Philippines, spoken by the Kalinga people, alongside Ilocano. The Banao Itneg variety is not one of the neighboring Itneg languages.

Dialects
Ronald Himes (1997) divides Kalinga into three dialects: Masadiit (in Abra), Northern Kalinga, and South-Central Kalinga.

Ethnologue reports the following locations for each of the eight Kalinga languages it identifies. Banao Itneg is classified by Ethnologue as Kalinga rather than Itneg.

Butbut Kalinga: spoken in Kalinga Province: Tinglayan and Butbut; Buscalan, Bugnay, Loccong, and Ngibat; Tabuk City, Lucnang, Pakak, Kataw, and Dinongsay. Also in Rizal: Annunang, Malapiat, Andarayan, and Bua. 15,000 speakers. Language status is 5 (developing), 1,000 monoglots. 
Limos Kalinga (Limos-Liwan Kalinga, Northern Kalinga): spoken in Kalinga Province (Tabuk City, north to border) and Conner municipality, Apayao Province. 12,700 speakers. Language status is 5 (developing). 
Lubuagan Kalinga: spoken in Kalinga Province (Lubuagan and Tabuk City). 30,000 speakers. Dialects are Guinaang, Balbalasang, Ableg-Salegseg, and Balatok-Kalinga (Balatok-Itneg). Pasil Kalinga. , Language status is 5 (developing).  
Mabaka Valley Kalinga (Kal-Uwan, Mabaka, Mabaka Itneg): spoken in Conner municipality, Apayao Province, as well as western Abra and northern Kalinga Province.
Majukayang Kalinga (Madukayang): spoken in Tabuk City, Kalinga Province and in Paracelis municipality, Mountain Province. 1,500 speakers as of 1990. , Language status is 6a. (Vigorous). 
Southern Kalinga: spoken in Kalinga Province (Lubuagan municipality; some also in Tabuk City) and Mountain Province (13 villages of Sadanga and Sagada municipalities). 11,000 speakers as of 1980. Dialects are Mallango, Sumadel, Bangad, and Tinglayan. 
Tanudan Kalinga (Lower Tanudan, Lower Tanudan Kalinga, Mangali Kalinga): spoken at the southern end of the Tanudan valley in southern Kalinga Province. 11,200 speakers as of 1998. Dialects are Minangali (Mangali), Tinaloctoc (Taluctoc), Pinangol (Pangul), Dacalan, and Lubo. Language status is 5 (developing). 1,120 monoglots. 
Banao Itneg (Banao, Banaw, Itneg, Timggian, Tinguian, Vanaw, Vyanaw, Bhanaw Tinggian): spoken in Kalinga Province (Balbalan and Pasil municipalities) and Abra (Daguioman and Malibcong municipalities). 3,500 speakers as of 2003. Dialects are Malibcong Banao, Banao Pikekj, Gubang Itneg and Daguioman.

Writing system

Lubuagan Kalinga

References

Further reading
 
 
 
 

Languages of Kalinga (province)
Languages of Apayao
South–Central Cordilleran languages